The Chibagalakh Range is a mountain range in the Sakha Republic (Yakutia), Far Eastern Federal District, Russia.

Despite the beauty of its landscapes the range is rarely visited owing to its remoteness. In 1977 a group of tourists from Kharkov visited the area and climbed Salishchev Peak. The nearest airport is Ust-Nera Airport.

Geology
With a length of over  the Chibagalakh Range is the largest batholith in the  area of Northeastern Russia. It is in part peraluminous two-mica granite —a granite containing both muscovite and biotite micas), being the showpiece of the "collisional" granites.

Geography
The Chibagalakh Range rises in the central area of the Chersky Range, between the valley of the Tuostakh —a tributary of the Adycha, and the valley of the Chibagalakh river of the Indigirka basin, while to the southeast lies the valley of the Charky river.

The Borong Range, another subrange of the Chersky Mountains, rises to the west parallel to it, the smaller Porozhny Range to the south, the Dogdo Range to the north and the Chemalgin Range to the northeast. Lake Tabanda is located in the range.

Flora
There are forests of larch covering the mountain slopes. At higher elevation there is a belt of dwarf cedar and further up mountain tundra.

See also
List of mountains and hills of Russia

References

External links
Озеро Табанда (Lake Tabanda)
Landscapes as a reflection of the toponyms of Yakutia
Ranges of Russia

Mountain ranges of the Sakha Republic
Chersky Range